Fish bone is any bone of a fish. Fish bone also includes the bony, delicate parts of the skeleton of bony fish, such as ribs and fin rays, but especially the ossification of connective tissue lying transversely inclined backwards to the ribs between the muscle segments and having no contact with the spine.

Not all fish have fish bones in this sense; for instance, eels and anglerfish do not.

There are several series of fish bones: Epineuralia, Epicentralia, Epipleuralia and Myorhabdoi.

Fish bones support the core muscles without inhibiting their motility.

In cuisine, fish bones are usually removed and not eaten. Because of their slim, tapered shape they may get caught in the esophagus and cause pain and will have to be removed by a doctor. 

Fish bones have been used to bioremediate lead from contaminated soil.

See also
 Fish meal

References

 Patterson C and Johnson GD (1995) The intermuscular bones and ligaments of teleostean fishes  Smithsonian contributions to zoology (USA).

Fish anatomy